Joe Timmons is a Scottish former football referee, who officiated in both the Scottish and English leagues. Born in 1952, he started off as a Scottish League official in the early 1980s before moving to Newcastle in England in his work as a bank manager. After one season as a linesman (1986–87) he was promoted to the middle and refereed for the next two seasons in the English Football League. He then moved back to Scotland (Kilwinning), and back to the Scottish referees list. Indeed, he made the Scottish FIFA panel of referees before leaving the list in the late 1990s.

References

Rothmans Football Yearbooks (1980s)
Football League Handbooks (1980s)

Living people
1952 births
Scottish football referees
English football referees
Scottish Football League referees
English Football League referees